New Era Building may refer to:

New Era Building (Maquoketa, Iowa)
New Era Building (New York City)
New Era Building (Lancaster, Pennsylvania)

See also
 New Era (disambiguation)